İnhisar is a town in Bilecik Province in the Marmara region of Turkey. It is the seat of İnhisar District. Its population is 960 (2021). The mayor is Mehmet Kepez (AKP).

History
From 1867 until 1922, İnhisar was part of Hüdavendigâr vilayet.

References

Populated places in Bilecik Province
Towns in Turkey
İnhisar District